Ekler'o'shock is an independent music house established in Paris in 2002. According to their website, they "produce, publish and manage artists that [they] believe in." Its current artists include Benjamin Clementine, DatA, Polo & Pan, Limousine, Paris, Alexandre Chatelard. Previous artists include Danger, Marie Madeleine, Maxence Cyrin, Léonard de Léonard and Terry Poison.

References

French record labels
2002 establishments in France
Record labels established in 2002